The Division of Clark is an Australian Electoral Division in the state of Tasmania, first contested at the 2019 federal election.

Geography
Federal electoral division boundaries in Australia are determined at redistributions by a redistribution committee appointed by the Australian Electoral Commission. Redistributions occur for the boundaries of divisions in a particular state, and they occur every seven years, or sooner if a state's representation entitlement changes or when divisions of a state are malapportioned.

History

The division is named in honour of Andrew Inglis Clark, the principal author of the Australian Constitution who was briefly Tasmanian Opposition Leader.

The Division of Clark replaced the seat of Denison during a redistribution process overseen by the Australian Electoral Commission in 2017. The division is located in central Hobart on the western shore of the River Derwent. It incorporates the area covered by the Cities of Hobart and Glenorchy, together with the northern parts of Kingborough Council, including Taroona, generally north of the Huon Highway. kunanyi / Mount Wellington is a prominent physical feature in the division's west. Clark is geographically identical to Denison, with the exception of a minor change at the electorate's southern border with the neighbouring Division of Franklin.

Members

Election results

References

External links
 Division of Clark – Australian Electoral Commission

Electoral divisions of Australia
Southern Tasmania
South East Tasmania
Constituencies established in 2019